The Deutsche Tourenwagen Meisterschaft (DTM) was a touring car racing series held from 1984 to 1996. Originally based in Germany, it held additional rounds elsewhere in Europe and later worldwide.

The original DTM had resumed racing with production based cars, as the former Deutsche Rennsport Meisterschaft had switched to Group 5 in 1977 and even to expensive Group C sportscars in 1982, leading to its decline. Since 2000, a new DTM has been run as the Deutsche Tourenwagen Masters, again organised by ITR and former Formula 1 driver Gerhard Berger.

History

Rise of the original DTM
The original DTM was started in 1984 as Deutschen Produktionswagen Meisterschaft (German Production Car Championship), with cars entered by privateer teams and under FIA Group A rules, but was extensively modified throughout the years, allowing more modifications. In the late 1980s, works teams joined the DTM, and it became one of the most popular motorsport championships in Europe.

Turbochargers were banned at the start of 1990 season due to cost reasons.

In 1993, the Group A rules were abandoned in favor of a more liberalised 2.5 L engine category called FIA Class 1 Touring Cars, with extensive use of ABS, four-wheel drive, electronic driver aids and carbon fibre chassis, the former three were technologies that were banned from F1. Opel, Mercedes-Benz and Alfa Romeo all fielded works teams after Audi and BMW had abandoned earlier.

DTM to ITC and demise
The DTM expanded its horizons for the 1995 season and the teams contested the inaugural FIA International Touring Car Series  as well as the traditional DTM. The former was contested over ten races, all held outside of Germany and the latter over fourteen races within Germany. Plans were then made to combine the two into one new series, the International Touring Car Championship, for 1996.  The ITR governing body then sought approval and support from the FIA to begin the new series.  In exchange for FIA support, the ITR let the organisation take control over many aspects of the way the ITC was run: crucially, the financial side of the championship was revolutionised.  A large proportion of the revenue generated by the championship went to the FIA, with the result that less went to the teams who subsequently complained of little return on their increasingly large investment in the high-tech series (this was further exacerbated by the travel costs to the new international rounds in Suzuka, Japan and Interlagos, Brazil). The FIA also increased the price for television rights dramatically with the result that television coverage of the series disappeared from all European countries except Italy, Germany and Finland, prices for tickets to races were almost doubled, and access to the circuit paddock to meet the drivers (which had previously been a big hit with fans) was drastically reduced.  The choices of circuits on which to hold rounds of the championship were also unsuccessful – the rounds at Magny-Cours, France and particularly Interlagos suffered very poor attendance.  Questions were also raised by the manufacturers as to why they were racing in countries in which their cars were not actually sold (Alfa Romeos were not sold in Brazil).  Opel and Alfa Romeo both left the championship after the 1996 season, leaving only Mercedes; the championship was consequently cancelled.

The new DTM

The DTM returned in 2000 with different rules and with semi-International Championship status. The DTM initials stands for Deutsche Tourenwagen Masters.

Champions

 In 1995 there were two different series with same drivers and teams competing. DTM consisted of seven German (2x Hockenheim, Avus, Norisring, Diepholz, Nürburgring and Singen) events and ITC five non-German (Mugello, Helsinki, Donington, Estoril, Magny-Cours) events.

See also
Deutsche Tourenwagen Masters
V8Star Series

External links

DTM official website
Audi Sport
AMG-Mercedes
Opel Motorsport
Schnitzer Motorsport

References

Defunct auto racing series
Touring car racing series
Auto racing series in Germany
Auto racing series in West Germany
Organizations established in 1984
Organizations disestablished in 1996
1984 establishments in West Germany
1996 disestablishments in Germany
Defunct sports competitions in Germany